HD5 may refer to:

HD5 of MediaCorp TV in Singapore
HD5 of Euro1080 owned by Alfacam in Belgium
HD 5 (HIP 429, BD+01 4825), a star in the Henry Draper Catalogue. It is a G5 star located at (J2000.0;)
Human Alpha Defensin 5, the DEFA5 gene product